Shahapur Vidhana Sabha seat is one of the seats in Karnataka Legislative Assembly in India. It is a segment of Raichur Lok Sabha seat.

Members of Assembly

Hyderabad State
 1951: Virupakshappa, Indian National Congress

Mysore State
 1957: Virupakshappa, Indian National Congress
 1962: Raja Pidnaik Raja Krishtappa Naik, Swatantra Party
 1967: R. V. N. R. K. Naik, Swatantra Party
 1972: Bapuguda Rayappa, Indian National Congress (Organisation)

Karnataka State
 1978:	Shivanna Sawoor, Indian National Congress (Indira)
 1983:	Bapugouda, Janata Party
 1985:	Shivashekhara Kharappagouda Gouda Sirwal, Indian National Congress
 1989:	Shivashekhara Kharappagouda Gouda Sirwal, Indian National Congress
 1994:	Sharanabassappa Darshanapur, Janata Dal
 1999:	Shivashekharappagouda Sirwal, Indian National Congress
 2004:	Sharanabassappa Darshanapur, Janata Dal (Secular)
 2008:	Sharanabassappa Darshanapur, Indian National Congress
 2013:	Guru Patil Shiraval, Karnataka Janata Party
 2018: Sharanabassappa Darshanapur, Indian National Congress

See also 
 List of constituencies of Karnataka Legislative Assembly

References 

Assembly constituencies of Karnataka
Yadgir district